Moïn Chaâbani (born June 18, 1981, Tunisia) is a Tunisian football coach and former footballer.

Managerial career
Chaâbani led Espérance de Tunis to two CAF Champions League titles in 2018 and 2019. He later went to Egypt to coach Al Masry in 2021–22, then Ceramica Cleopatra in 2023.

References

1981 births
Living people
Tunisian footballers
Tunisia international footballers
Tunisian expatriate footballers
Espérance Sportive de Tunis players
MKE Ankaragücü footballers
CS Hammam-Lif players
Al-Qadsiah FC players
Süper Lig players
Saudi Professional League players
Expatriate footballers in Turkey
Tunisian expatriate sportspeople in Turkey
Expatriate footballers in Saudi Arabia
Tunisian expatriate sportspeople in Saudi Arabia
Association football defenders
People from Béja
Tunisian football managers
Espérance Sportive de Tunis managers
Al Masry SC managers
Tunisian expatriate football managers
Expatriate football managers in Egypt
Tunisian expatriate sportspeople in Egypt
Egyptian Premier League managers